Dilara Aksüyek (born 24 July 1987) is a Turkish actress.

Aksüyek was born in Karşıyaka. At the age of 7, she moved with her family to Edirne. In 2007, she moved to Istanbul and studied theatre at Müjdat Gezen Art Center. She made her television debut in 2012 with a role in the series Evlerden Biri. She was first noted with her role in the 2013 drama series Merhamet as Şadiye. The following year, she portrayed the character of Deniz in Kadim Dostum.

In 2015, she portrayed Mahfiruz Hatun in the historical drama Muhteşem Yüzyıl: Kösem. She had her breakthrough in 2017 with a leading role in İstanbullu Gelin.

Filmography

References

External links 
 
 

1987 births
People from Karşıyaka
Turkish television actresses
Living people